Torjesen is a Norwegian surname and may refer to:

 Eric Torjesen, lead guitarist for the band Starship from 1996–2000
  (1820–1905), Norwegian politician
 Peter Torjesen (1892–1939), Norwegian missionary to China
  (b.1958), Norwegian soprano
 Stina Torjesen, Norwegian academic

Norwegian-language surnames